Mylochromis balteatus is a species of cichlid endemic to Lake Malawi preferring areas with sandy substrates.  This species can reach a length of  TL.

References

balteatus
Fish described in 1935
Taxonomy articles created by Polbot